Odd Couple is a 1979 Hong Kong martial arts comedy film directed by Lau Kar-wing, who also stars, alongside Sammo Hung. It was the first film to be released by Gar Bo Motion Picture Company (aka. Gar-Bo Film Company), an independent production company set up by Hung, Lau and producer Karl Maka. The fight scenes are mainly weapon-based, with particular emphasis on the contrast between the dao (sword) and qiang (spear).

The film is sometimes listed as The Odd Couple, Dance of Death or The Eternal Conflict.

Plot
The film is set in the Manchu era. Two aging martial artists get together once a year for a timed duel. One is master of the short sword, King of Sabres (Sammo Hung), and the other is King of Spears (Lau Kar-wing). Every year the fight ends in a draw, and as the masters are getting old, they decide the best course of action is to each take on a student to determine who is the better teacher. They agree to meet up again 10 years later, with their students and let the next generation carry on the duel.

A previously upright martial artist known as Old Yellow Dog (Bryan Leung) kidnaps the students (also played by Lau and Hung) before their duel can begin. It transpires in a flashback that the master was defeated in separate battles with the King of Sabres and the King of Spears, and was forced to retire from fighting. Now, after years of training in the long bladed staff and with a new name, Laughing Bandit, he wants to lure the old masters out to exact his revenge. The old masters arrive, first taking on the Laughing Bandit's four disciples and killing them. However, this was a ploy to tire them out, and individually they are unable to defeat Laughing Bandit and his new techniques. The evil master suggests the old men both attack at once, but because of their pride and belief in their own superiority, they refuse. The students are released, while each master is fighting, and are instructed to escape. After some protestation they do, and the old masters are killed.

Fuelled by revenge, the students agree to join forces to defeat the evil master. Hung's character (the new King of Spears) comes up with a plan us to use magnets that can pull the Laughing Bandit's weapon from him. After luring him out into the open, they fight him unarmed, choosing to mimic their weapon styles with empty hands, but with the magnet they are able to disrupt his attacks, and after a gruelling fight they triumph. They kill the evil master.

After burying their masters, they decide to honour their memory by fulfilling their request to duel. However, as with their masters before them, the fight ends in a draw. Instead, they decide to resolve who is the greatest by playing a game, rather than fighting. Each must try to place his weapon into their masters burial mound, whilst simultaneously stopping their opponent from doing so. After another long competition, the film ends with the pair laughing at the absurdity of the rivalry and realising that as friends they will never be able to determine who is the best.

Cast
 Sammo Hung as King of Sabres / Ah Yo (2 roles)
 Lau Kar-wing as King of Spears / Stubborn Wing (2 roles) (as Kar Wing Lau)
 Bryan Leung as Laughing Bandit aka Old Yellow Dog / Scarface (as Kar Yan Leung)
 Mars as Potato
 Dean Shek as Master Rocking / Playboy
 Billy Chan as Humpback / Tien (2 roles)
 Lam Ching Ying as Ha (Laughing Bandit's fighter)
 Yuen Miu as Mo (Laughing Bandit's fighter)
 Chung Fat as Ti (Laughing Bandit's fighter)
 Huang Ha as Single Sabre Wu Li
 Yeung Sai Gwan as Tiger Spear
 Peter Chan Lung as Pak Chow / Cloud Sabre
 Karl Maka as Cloud Sabre's challenge
 Ho Pak Kwong as Master Rocking's assistant
 Tai San as Master Rocking's assistant
 Chan Ling Wai as Master Rocking's assistant
 Hoi Sang Lee as Thug
 Cheung Chok Chow as Tea house boss
 Benny Lai as Extra
 Yuen Biao as Stunt Double

Production
In the film, Sammo Hung and Lau Kar-wing play two roles each, a master and a student. Hung plays the King of Sabres and his student is played by Lau, and Lau plays the King of Spears and his student is played by Hung. In the later part of the film, all 'four' characters appear in scenes together. Both students become proficient in their weapons, allowing the actors, in their opposing roles, to demonstrate their skills with both weapons.

References

External links
 
 
 Odd Couple at Hong Kong Movie Database
 Odd Couple at Hong Kong Cinemagic

1979 films
1970s Cantonese-language films
Hong Kong action comedy films
Hong Kong buddy films
Hong Kong martial arts comedy films
Kung fu films
Wushu films
Hong Kong films about revenge
1979 martial arts films
1970s martial arts films
Films set in Guangdong
1970s buddy comedy films
1970s action comedy films
1979 comedy films
1970s Hong Kong films